Leslie Alan Clark (16 December 1930 – 21 September 2017), known as Alan Clark, was a New Zealand cricketer. He played first-class cricket for Wellington, Otago and Auckland between 1959 and 1962. His father, also named Leslie, was a cricket umpire and also played first-class cricket for Otago.

Clarl was born at Wellington in 1930. After he retired from playing he became a selector for the Auckland side.

References

External links
 

1930 births
2017 deaths
New Zealand cricketers
Auckland cricketers
Otago cricketers
Wellington cricketers
Cricketers from Wellington City